Chris O'Shea is a British businessman and the chief executive (CEO) of Centrica.

In April 2020 O'Shea became the CEO of Centrica, having previously been finance director. From 2018 to 2022, O'Shea forewent annual bonuses of over £1M citing the hardships faced by consumers during Covid and then the international energy price crisis. In 2023, Centrica posted year-end profits of over £3B and O'Shea faced calls to forego his bonus again.

References

External links
 Centrica board

Living people
British chief executives in the energy industry
Centrica people
Year of birth missing (living people)